A blade is a sharp cutting part, for instance of a weapon or tool.

Blade or Blades may also refer to:

Arts and entertainment

Fictional characters 
 Blade (character), a Marvel Comics character
Blade (New Line franchise character)
Blade (Marvel Cinematic Universe character)
 Blade (Masters of the Universe), in the Masters of the Universe franchise series
 Blade (Puppet Master), of the Puppet Master horror film franchise
 Blades (Transformers), several robot superhero characters in the Transformers robot superhero franchise
 Richard Blade (series), eponymous hero of an adult fantasy pulp novel series
 Kamen Rider Blade, the eponymous character of a Japanese tokusatsu series

Film and television 
 Blade (1973 film), a film featuring Morgan Freeman
 Blades (film), a 1989 US horror-comedy film
 The Blade (film), a 1995 Hong Kong martial arts film directed by Tsui Hark
 Blade (franchise), three films and a television series based on the Marvel Comics character
 Blade (1998 film), the first film in the Blade franchise, which was released in 1998
 Blade (soundtrack), the soundtrack to the first film in the Blade trilogy
 Blade II, the second film in the Blade franchise, which was released in 2002
 Blade: Trinity, the third and final film in the Blade franchise, which was released in 2004
 Blade: The Series, set after the events of the last film, which ran in 2006
 Blade (2024 film), an upcoming reboot of the Blade franchise, set in the Marvel Cinematic Universe

Video games 
 Blade (video game), for the Game Boy Color and PlayStation, based on the Marvel Comics Character’s first movie by New Line Cinema
 Blades, a fictional organization in The Elder Scrolls series of computer games
 The Elder Scrolls: Blades, a 2019 mobile game in the Elder Scrolls franchise
 Blades, powerful beings in Xenoblade Chronicles 2
 BLADE, a fictional military organization in Xenoblade Chronicles X

Other arts and entertainment 
 The Blades (band), an Irish band
 Blades (hip hop group), an Australian hip hop group from Newcastle, New South Wales
 Blade (artscene group), a group active during the 1990s
 Blades Club, M's private card club featured in several of Ian Fleming's James Bond novels

Computing and technology 
 Airfoil, for example, the rotor blade on a helicopter or wind turbine
 Blade, a templating engine used in the Laravel PHP framework
 BLADE (software), Block All Drive-by Download Exploits, software developed at Georgia Tech and SRI International
 Blade server, a self-contained computer server, designed for high density
 Blade PC
 Blade battery, a long-shaped battery manufactured by BYD Company
 Breakthrough Laminar Aircraft Demonstrator in Europe (BLADE), a laminar flow experiment
 Turbine blade, a component of a gas turbine or steam turbine
 ZTE Blade, a cellphone manufactured by the ZTE Corporation

Biology 
 Blade (algae), another word for lamina, a leaf-like structure on seaweed
 Blade or lamina, the (usually) flattened part of a typical plant leaf
 Botanical term for the wider distal part of a petal, sepal or bract
 Scapula, a bone in the human body sometimes referred to as the shoulder blade 
 Tongue blade, the part of the tongue just behind the tip

People
 Blade (artist), gay erotic artist
 Richard Blade, radio, television, and film personality
 Blade (surname)
 Blades (surname)
 Blade, a ring name of Al Green (wrestler) (1955–2013), American professional wrestler

Places
 Blades, Delaware, a town in Delaware, United States
 Blades, Saint Philip, Barbados, a village in Saint Philip, Barbados
 The Blade, Manchester, a residential skyscraper in Manchester, England
 The Blade, Reading, a high-rise building in Reading, England

Publications 
 The Blade (Toledo), a newspaper in Toledo, Ohio
 Washington Blade, a gay newspaper
 The New York Blade, a gay newspaper
 Monthly Comic Blade, a monthly manga anthology magazine
 Blade (magazine), a knife collecting magazine

Sports

Teams 
 Chengdu Blades F.C., a Chinese football club
 Kansas City Blades, a defunct American ice hockey team
 Los Angeles Blades, an inline hockey team in California
 Saskatoon Blades, a Western Hockey League franchise
 Sheffield United F.C., an English football club nicknamed "The Blades"
 Sheffield Wednesday F.C., an English football club formerly nicknamed "The Blades"

Equipment 
 Inline skates, colloquially known as "blades" or "roller blades"
 Football boots with moulded studs, commonly known as "blades"
 A component of a spinnerbait fishing lure
 Blade, a part of an oar (sport rowing); also the whole oar 
 Muscle-back iron or blade, a type of golf club, referring to the shape of an iron's clubhead
 A type of lower leg prosthesis used by amputee athletes in running events

Mascots 
 Blades the Bruin, the mascot of the Boston Bruins ice hockey team

Other uses 
 Blade (company), a crowdsourced short-distance aviation company
 Blade (geometry), a generalization of vectors in higher-dimensional vector spaces in geometric algebra
 FreeX Blade, a German paraglider design
 Toyota Blade
 Blade, an often curved metal plate on the front of a bulldozer
 Blade, a station ident for British television channel BBC Two from the 1991–2001 series
 The Blades (aerobatic team), a British aircraft display team
 Blades, a modish London tailoring establishment founded in 1962 by Rupert Lycett Green
 Bristol Laboratory for Advanced Dynamics Engineering
 HNLMS Z 5 (1915), a Dutch torpedo boat which was renamed Blade while serving in the British Royal Navy in World War II

See also 
 Blading (professional wrestling), to cut oneself in order to draw blood for dramatic effect
 Bladee, a Swedish rapper/songwriter
 Bladezz, a character in The Guild (web series)